Willie Clarke may refer to:

 Willie Clarke (politician) (born 1966), Irish republican politician from Northern Ireland
 Willie Clarke (songwriter), American musician and songwriter
 Willie Clarke (footballer) (1878–1949), Scottish footballer

See also  
 Willie Clark (disambiguation)
 William Clarke (disambiguation)